The Type 071 (NATO reporting name: Yuzhao) is a class of Chinese amphibious transport dock ships in service with the People's Liberation Army Navy (PLAN). The Type 071 provides the PLAN with capabilities and flexibility not found in its previous landing ships.

Design
The amphibious warfare ship features a vehicle deck, well-deck, landing deck and a hangar. It can carry a combination of marines, vehicles, landing craft and helicopters. The ship may embark 600 to 800 troops. The stern helicopter deck offers two landing spots for supporting the operations of two Z-8 (SA 321 Super Frelon) transport helicopters. The twin-door cantilever hangar can house up to four Z-8 helicopters. The well deck houses up to four Type 726 air-cushioned landing craft, which can transfer vehicles or marines to the shore at high speed. The LCAC are launched by flooding of the docking area. The vessel can also carry landing craft on port / starboard davits. The vehicle deck can house amphibious assault vehicles including the ZBD05 amphibious IFV and the ZTD-05 amphibious light tank. The stern ramp, two side doors and ramps allow rapid loading of the vehicles and equipment.

The ship is armed with one 76 mm gun and four 30 mm close-in weapon systems.

The Type 071 may operate as the flagship of a task force. The Type 071 may also conduct and support humanitarian, disaster relief, and counterpiracy missions, in addition to amphibious assaults.

Export
The China State Shipbuilding and Trading Corp. consortium offered to build a modified Type 071 for the Royal Malaysian Navy. The Malaysians had a requirement for a 13,000-ton LPD; the Type 071 would cost a third of the similar US-built  LPD.

The Royal Thai Navy ordered one export version, designated Type 071E, in 2019.

Ships of the class

China

Thailand

See also 

 People's Liberation Army Navy Surface Force

References

External links 
 IDEX 2007 Showcases China’s Productive Weapons Sector
 Type 071 Yuzhao class Amphibious Transport Dock (LPD)

 

Amphibious warfare vessel classes
Amphibious warfare vessels of the People's Liberation Army Navy